The members of the National Executive Committee of the African National Congress elected at the 55th national conference held in 2022 at Nasrec. It succeeded the National Executive Committee elected back in 2017 at the 54th national conference.

Officials
The conference began on 16 December 2022 at Nasrec where the previous conference was held back in 2017. After several delays, voting to elect the Top Seven officials began in the evening of Sunday 18 December and continued into the night. The results of the election, as announced on 19 December, were as follows (with winners in bold):

Additional members
On 20 December 2022, voting delegates voted for the additional members of the National Executive Committee. The following day, the chairperson of the ANC's electoral committee Kgalema Motlanthe released the names of the 80 new additional members.

Co-opted members 
On 30 January 2023, the ANC announced that it had co-opted four party members onto the NEC in an attempt to increase minority representation on the party's highest decision-making body between conferences. The four party members are as follows:

Gerhard Koornhof
Alvin Botes
Fawzia Peer
Steve Mapaseka Letsike

References

African National Congress